Still Point is the fifth studio album by American experimental band Amber Asylum. The album was released on May 15, 2007 through Release Records and Relapse Records.

Track listing

Credits
Liz Allbee - trumpet
John Cobbett - acoustic guitar (track 6)
Kris Force - vocals, viola, violin
Eric Peterson - acoustic guitar
Lorraine Rath - acoustic bass, vocals, flute

References 

2007 albums
Amber Asylum albums